The Technical University of Gabrovo is a state university in Gabrovo, Bulgaria, founded in 1964.

Faculties
 Faculty of Electrical Engineering
 Faculty of Mechanical Engineering and Technologies
 Faculty of Economy

See also
 Balkan Universities Network
 List of universities in Bulgaria
 Gabrovo

References

External links
 Technical University of Gabrovo - Website

Gabrovo
Gabrovo, Technical University of
Gabrovo
Educational institutions established in 1964
Buildings and structures in Gabrovo Province
1964 establishments in Bulgaria